Louis Johannes Koen (born 7 July 1975 in Cape Town, South Africa) is a South-African rugby union player who played for the Springboks, until 2003, when he moved abroad following the World Cup.

Effective at either fly half or full back, his career began with Western Province, before his move to the Lions and later the Bulls. He was part of the Western Province team that won the Currie Cup in 1997, contributing immensely with his accurate goal kicking. It was this dependable boot that led to his recall to the Springbok team in 2003 after a two-year absence, but following South Africa's disappointing exit in the quarter-finals, Koen was signed by Narbonne in France. After two years dogged by injury, Koen moved back to Western province as only the second full-time kicking coach in South Africa. At only 29 it was reputed that Koen may consider a return to playing, but a year into his contract he has yet to pull on the famous blue and white hoops, and his talents are now most likely to be utilised developing the young and talented Peter Grant. In 2010 he was recalled out of retirement to play one Currie Cup First Division match for the Boland Cavaliers against the Valke.

Career

Provincial
 Lions (South Africa) – 28 caps
 Western Province (South Africa) – 46 caps
 Boland Cavaliers – 1 cap

Super Rugby
 Stormers (South Africa) – 12 caps (86 points- 2 tries, 20 conversions, 11 penalty goals, 1 drop goal) 
 Cats (South Africa) – 28 caps (330 points- 3 tries, 42 conversions, 74 penalty goals, 3 drop goals)
 Bulls (South Africa) – 11 caps (139 points- 17 conversions, 28 penalty goals, 7 drop goals)

Club
 Stellenbosch

National Team
He made his debut test match with the Springboks 8 July 2000 against the Australian Team.

He played in the World Cup 2003 (4 matches).

Achievements

With the Springboks
(au 31 December 2005)
 15 caps
 0 tries, 23 conversions, 31 penalties, 2 drops
 145 points
 Selections per season : 1 in 2000, 3 in 2001, 11 in 2003.
 Participation at the World Cup 2003 (4 matches).

With club and province
 Scored 577 points for Western Province (46 matches, 11 tries, 123 conversions, 92 penalty goals) (1996–99)
 Scored 391 points for Lions (28 matches, 5 tries, 87 conversions, 60 penalty goals, 4 drop goals) (2000–02)
 Scored 12 points for Boland Cavaliers (1 match, 3 conversions, 2 penalty goals) (2010)

External links
 Site springboks
 Statistiques scrum.com
 Statistiques Sporting Heroes

1975 births
Living people
South African rugby union players
South Africa international rugby union players
Lions (United Rugby Championship) players
Golden Lions players
Western Province (rugby union) players
Stormers players
Bulls (rugby union) players
Rugby union players from Cape Town
Rugby union fly-halves